China Film Association is a subordinate of the China Federation of Literary and Art Circles (CFLAC). Founded in July 1949, the organisation was initially named the China National Film Artists Association. In 1979, it was renamed the  China Film Association. So far it has more than 6,000 registered members, with branch associations across the nation.

History
China Film Association was founded in July 1949 with the name of China National Film Artists Association and then China Film Workers Sorority in 1957. In 1960, China Film Association changed its name to China Film Workers Association. Finally, it renamed the China Film Association in 1979.

Major officials

9th members of the board
Chairman: Li Xuejian
Vice-chairmen: Wang Xingdong, Yin Li, Feng Xiaogang, Jackie Chan, Zhang Huijun, Zhang Hongsen, Chen Kaige, Ming Zhenjiang, Xi Meijuan, Huang Jianxin, Kang Jianmin, and Pan Hong.
Secretary-General: Rao Shuguang

10th members of the board
 Chairman: Chen Daoming
 Vice-chairmen: Yu Dong, Yin Li, Yin Hong, Jackie Chan, Ren Zhonglun, Su Xiaowei, Wu Jing, Zhang Hong, Zhang Hanyu, Huang Bo, La Peikang

List of Chairman

Awards
Hundred Flowers Awards and Golden Rooster Awards are given out by the China Film Association.

Academic journal
 Popular Movies
 World Screen
 Film Art
 World Movies
 Annals of China Movies

References

External links
 

1949 establishments in China
Arts organizations based in China
Arts organizations established in 1949
Film organizations in China